The National Museum of Science and Industry of Catalonia known by its acronym (mNACTEC) is one of the three national museums of Catalonia, located in Terrassa, near Barcelona. Its mission is to showcase and promote an understanding of scientific, technical and industrial culture, and furthermore to preserve, study and present the establishment and evolution of scientific and technical advances in Catalonia, their industrial application, and above all their social implications and impact.
The museum is an anchor point on the European Route of Industrial Heritage.

Building

The museum is housed in the iconic Vapor Aymerich, Amat i Jover in Terrassa near Barcelona. It was designed by the Catalan architect Lluís Muncunill for Messrs Aymerich, Amat i Jover in 1909. He solved the problem of roofing the immense weaving shed with row upon row of 161 shell-shaped half arches, each with gently curving windows: this served the same function as the saw-toothed north lights in a Lancashire weaving shed.   The columns broke up the usable space of the factory so had to be carefully placed around the looms. The columns functioned as rain water drainage, and held the line shafting that transmitted power from the stationary steam engine to the looms. The engine house and other parts of the building feature the Catalan vault. The factory was severely affected by the flooding of 1963 and it finally closed in 1978. It was bought by the state in 1983 and opened as a museum.

Museum
mNACTEC runs several museums across Catalonia, this one specialises on textiles. The aim of the museum is to provide a comprehensive overview of the history of knowledge and technology in Catalonia, and the process of industrialisation. It starts with the Neolithic revolution, shows power generation techniques with waterwheels, electricity and turbine drives and solar technology.

Collections

Lluís Muncunill the works of the architect
Homo Faber evolution of technology, from Neolithic times up to the Industrial revolution
The textile mill (La Fàbrica Tèxtil)A complete cotton factory
Enérgeia Energy
El transport i motos Montesa Collection of cars, lorries, engines, aeroplanes, motorbikes and bicycles.
La terrassa del Sol experiments investigating the power and functioning of the sun.
Mentora Alsina Virtual visit to the physics laboratory of Ferran Alsina.
Área d'interpretació del mNACTEC multifunctional space relating to the industry of Catalonia.
El cos humà Intrepretation of the body and the  Fundació-Museu d'Història de la Medicina de Catalunya, historic medical instrument collection.

References
Notes

Footnotes

External links

 Museum Website

Industry museums in Catalonia
Terrassa
Museums in Catalonia
Textile museums in Catalonia
Technology museums in Spain
European Route of Industrial Heritage Anchor Points